Agathidium mandibulare is a species of round fungus beetle in the family Leiodidae.

References 

Leiodidae
Beetles described in 1807